Taman Setia Jaya (Jawi: تامن ستيا جاي 2) is a township in Bandar Penggaram, Batu Pahat District, Johor, Malaysia.

Development of the township began in 2006 after another nearby township, Taman Flora Utama. Taman Setia Jaya 2 is located along Jalan Tan Siew Hoe. The new township is developing rapidly and there are many shops moving in from older parts of town and also many new shops in this township. A shopping area, Carrefour hypermarket and Square One Shopping Mall (第一坊) is just located beside this township.

This township is under the jurisdiction of Batu Pahat Municipal Council.

See also 

 Cities of Malaysia
 SMK Tinggi Batu Pahat
 Taman Flora Utama
 Taman Bukit Pasir
 Pura Kencana
 Batu Pahat Mall

Batu Pahat District
Townships in Johor